This is a list of satellite television channels in Malayalam language (spoken in the Indian state of Kerala and the Union territory of Lakshadweep) broadcasting at least throughout Kerala state and in Middle East Countries. Besides these channels, there exist a number of local channels concentrating in a particular area or town in the region.

List of Channels

State Owned Channels

General Entertainment

Movies

Music

Comedy

Kids

Infotainment

Devonation

Shopping

News

Malayalam HD Channels

Malayalam audio feeds
Some Indian channels (mainly English) are telecasting with multiple audio feeds, including Malayalam.

Discovery Channel
Discovery Kids
ETV Bal Bharat
National Geographic - Malayalam audio feed coming soon.
Nickelodeon
Nickelodeon Sonic
Sony Yay
&flix - Malayalam audio feed coming soon.
Cartoon Network - malayalam audio feed coming soon.
Pogo ( TV Channel ) - malayalam audio feed coming soon.

Upcoming channels

Cable TV channels
These channels do not have MIB permission for satellite up-linking or down-linking. They are available only on cable tv networks, not on any DTH platforms.
ACV
ACV News
ACV Utsav
ACV Utsav Plus
Asianet Teleshop
Jukebox
Medley
Rosebowl

International channels
These channels mainly for Malayali people residing outside India. These channels have permission to Uplink from India, but no downlink permission from India.

Asianet Middle East - GEC from Disney Star
Butterfly TV - GEC started by gulf malayalees. First Indian channel to Launch in Qatar.
Flowers TV USA - GEC from Insight Media City.
Mazhavil Manorama International - GEC from Malayala Manorama (MM) TV Ltd.
Media One Gulf - GEC from Madhyamam Broadcasting Ltd.
Kairali Arabia - GEC from Malayalam Communications Limited.
UBL HD - GEC from United Arab Emirates, available through E-Vision and online.
NTV HD - GEC from United Arab Emirates, available through E-Vision.

Defunct channels
Indiavision - Malayalam news channel from Indiavision Satellite Communications.
Kiran TV - Replaced by Surya Movies.
Surya Action - Replaced by Surya Comedy.
TV New - Malayalam news channel from the Kerala Chamber of Commerce and Industry (KCCI).
Yes Indiavision - youth entertainment channel from Indiavision.

See also
List of Malayalam-language radio stations
List of Tamil language television channels
List of Telugu language television channels
List of Kannada language television channels
List of 4K channels in India

References

Lists of television channels by language
Lists of television channels in India
Television
 
television channels